Abdil Ceylan (born 30 April 1983 in Çifteler, Eskişehir Province, Turkey ) is a Turkish long-distance and marathon runner. He participated at the 2008 Olympics.

He graduated from the School of Physical Education and Sports at Gazi University in Ankara.

References

1983 births
People from Çifteler
Gazi University alumni
Turkish male long-distance runners
Turkish male marathon runners
Kocaeli Büyükşehir Belediyesi Kağıt Spor athletes
Olympic athletes of Turkey
Athletes (track and field) at the 2008 Summer Olympics
Living people
20th-century Turkish people
21st-century Turkish people